King is the given name or nickname of:

Given name
 King Baggot (1879–1948), American actor, director and screenwriter
 King C. Gillette (1855–1932), American businessman
 King Fisher (1854–1884), American Old West gunslinger
 King Floyd (1945–2006), American soul singer and songwriter
 M. King Hubbert (1903–1989), American geologist, the originator of the theory of peak oil
 King Lysen (1942–2017), American politician
 King O'Malley (1854–1953), Australian politician
 King Parsons (born 1949), American professional wrestler
 King G. Staples (1851–1910), American politician
 King Vidor (1894–1982), American film director, producer and screenwriter

Nickname
 Joe Carrasco (born 1953), American Tex-Mex new wave guitarist, vocalist and songwriter
 Robert Carter I (1662/63–1732), businessman, planter and colonist in Virginia  
 King Clancy (1903–1986), Canadian ice hockey player, coach, and executive
 King Kelly (1857–1894), American baseball player and manager
 King Moody (1929–2001), American actor and comedian
 King Oliver (1885–1938), African American jazz cornet player and bandleader

Fictional characters
 King Bradley, a main antagonist in the anime/manga series Fullmetal Alchemist
 King Dedede, a character of the Kirby video game franchise
 King Hippo, a boxer from the Punch-Out!! video game franchise
 King K. Rool, the main antagonist in Nintendo's Donkey Kong video game franchise
 King Clawthorne, one of the main characters of the animated series The Owl House

Masculine given names
Lists of people by nickname